Astrothelium laurerosphaerioides is a species of corticolous (bark-dwelling),  crustose lichen in the family Trypetheliaceae. Found in Guyana, it was formally described as a new species in 2016 by Dutch lichenologist André Aptroot. An anthraquinone compound was the only lichen product detected in the collected specimens using thin-layer chromatography. The characteristics of the lichen distinguishing it from others in Astrothelium are its - ascomata that have an exposed blackish area around their ostioles; the presence of two ascospores per ascus, and the dimensions of the spores (110–130 by 30–35 μm).

References

laurerosphaerioides
Lichen species
Lichens described in 2016
Lichens of Guyana
Taxa named by André Aptroot